Do You Want to See a Dead Body? is an American surreal comedy streaming television series created by Owen Burke and Rob Huebel that premiered on November 17, 2017, on YouTube Red.

On April 10, 2019, YouTube canceled the series.

Premise
Do You Want to See a Dead Body? follows  "Rob Huebel and his celebrity friends who begrudgingly join him on adventures that see them frolicking at the beach, getting tacos...oh...and seeing a dead body."

Cast and characters

Main
 Rob Huebel as himself

Recurring
 Josh Robert Thompson as the voice of Morgan Freeman

Guest
 Rory Scovel as Cool Pharmacist ("A Body and a Puddle")
 Seth Morris as Nude Beach Bully 1 ("A Body and an Actor")
 John Gemberling as Nude Beach Bully 2 ("A Body and an Actor")
 Ron Funches as Terry ("A Body and a Plane")
 Eugene Cordero as Gregory ("A Body and a High School Reunion")
 Diona Reasonover as Julie ("A Body and Some Pants")
 Brody Stevens as Brody ("A Body and Some Pants)
 Neil Casey as Dead Guy ("A Body and Some Pants")
 Rich Fulcher as Derek ("A Body and an Ex-Con")
 Dana Gaier as Daria ("A Body and a Jet Ski")
 Matthew Glave as Mel ("A Body and a Breakup")
 Monika Smith as Katie ("A Body and a Breakup")
 Brandon Wardell as Edvard ("A Body and a Breakup")

Episodes

Production

Background
The concept for the series originated out of a recurring sketch from the HBO series Funny or Die Presents. Those sketches eventually made their way to YouTube and the FunnyOrDie website where they received more notability. Rob Huebel and Owen Burke, who created those original sketches, later decided to expand upon them with a full series. Huebel has commented that the show was loosely inspired by his fascination with 1980s projects like Stand by Me where kids could go off into the wilderness in search of an adventure, in addition to moments from Huebel's own childhood when he and childhood friends would “find Penthouse magazines in these weird forts of teenagers.”

Development
On June 22, 2017, it was announced that YouTube had given the production a series order for a first season consisting of eight episodes. Executive producers were set to include Rob Huebel, Owen Burke, Nick Jasenovec, and Jonathan Stern. Production companies producing the series include Abominable Pictures and Funny or Die.

Casting
Alongside the series order announcement, it was confirmed that Rob Huebel would star in the series and that it would feature guest appearances from Adam Scott, Judy Greer, Terry Crews, Craig Robinson, and John Cho, among others.

References

External links
 

2017 American television series debuts
2017 American television series endings
2010s American surreal comedy television series
English-language television shows
YouTube Premium original series